
Gmina Moskorzew is a rural gmina (administrative district) in Włoszczowa County, Świętokrzyskie Voivodeship, in south-central Poland.

Villages

Gmina Moskorzew contains the villages and settlements of Chebdzie, Chlewice, Chlewska Wola, Dąbrówka, Dalekie, Damiany, Jadwigów, Lubachowy, Mękarzów, Moskorzew, Perzyny, Przybyszów and Tarnawa Góra.

Neighbouring gminas
Gmina Moskorzew is bordered by the gminas of Nagłowice, Radków, Słupia and Szczekociny.

References
 Polish official population figures 2006

Moskorzew
Włoszczowa County